The 2021 FAI Cup was the 101st edition of the Republic of Ireland's primary national cup competition. This edition features teams from the League of Ireland Premier Division and the First Division, as well as non-league teams. The competition is to begin with qualifying on the week ending 11 July 2021. 
 
The winners of the FAI Cup earns automatic qualification for the 2022–23 UEFA Europa Conference League.

Qualifying round

The draw for the qualifying round took place on 14 June 2021.

A total of 18 teams were in the qualifying round draw. Six teams received byes into the first round of the competition: Bangor GG F.C., Malahide United, Liffey Wanderers, St. Kevin's Boys, Usher Celtic and College Corinthians

First round

The draw for the first round took place on 13 July 2021.

A total of 32 teams are in the first round draw: 20 teams from the Premier Division and First Division, six teams who received byes from the qualifying round and six winners of the qualifying round. 

All ties were played the week ending Sunday 25 July 2021.

Teams in bold advanced to the second round.

Bracketed number denotes which tier team currently plays in

Second round

The draw for the second round was made on 27 July 2021 at 6:30pm.

All ties were set to be played the week ending Sunday 29 August 2021.

Teams in bold advanced to the Quarter-finals.

Quarter-finals
The draw for the quarter-finals was made on 31 August 2021 at 6:30pm.

All ties were set to be played the week ending Sunday 19 September 2021.

Teams in bold advanced to the Semi-finals.

Semi-finals
The draw for the semi-finals was made on 24 September 2021 at 9:45pm after the league game between Shamrock Rovers and St Patrick's Athletic by former League of Ireland player Conan Byrne live on RTÉ2.

All ties are set to be played the week ending Sunday 22 October 2021.

Teams in bold advanced to the Semi-finals.

Final

References 

FAI Cup seasons
2021 in Irish sport
2021 in Republic of Ireland association football cups

External links
 FAI Cup on soccerway